Malcolm Lee Beggs (1907 – December 10, 1956) was an American stage, television and film actor.

Biography
The son of actor/director Lee Beggs and stage actress Doris Singleton, he began performing professionally on the stage at the age of 5. He made appearances in two silent films: The Silent Plea (1914) and In Bridal Attire (1915). In 1936 he made his Broadway debut as Don Abacchio in Bitter Stream. He went on to appear in the original Broadway productions of Devils Galore (1945), Metropole (1949), Seventh Heaven (1955), and Mr. Wonderful (1956). He also starred as William M. Tweed in the 1947 Broadway revival of Up in Central Park.

On television, Beggs made guest appearances on Captain Video and His Video Rangers (1949), Lux Video Theatre (1951), Hopalong Cassidy (1952), three episodes of Hallmark Hall of Fame (1952–1953), four episodes of Kraft Theatre (1949–1953), Campbell Summer Soundstage (1954), Robert Montgomery Presents (1954), Ponds Theater (1954), and The Elgin Hour (1955). His film credits include Love Island (1952), It Grows on Trees (1952), Botany Bay (1953), Houdini (1953), and Edge of Fury (1958).

Beggs was beaten to death with whisky and beer bottles at the age of 49 in his Chicago hotel room by two men, Robert Mitchell, 17 (also known as Melvin Manes)  and Haskell Kellems, 18. His interment was in Valhalla, New York's Kensico Cemetery.

References

External links

1907 births
1956 deaths
20th-century American male actors
American male film actors
American male stage actors
Actors from East Orange, New Jersey
Male actors from New Jersey
People murdered in Illinois
Male murder victims
Deaths by beating in the United States
Burials at Kensico Cemetery